The Sons of Zadok ( bǝnê Ṣādōq) are a family of priests, kohens, descended from Zadok, the first high priest in Solomon's Temple.

The sons of Zadok are mentioned three times in the Hebrew Bible, as part of the Third Temple prophecy in the final chapters of the Book of Ezekiel, and are a theme in Jewish and Christian interpretation of these chapters.

Hebrew Bible

The Aaronic priesthood in the Tanakh 

The Tanakh records how prior to the death of Aaron at Hor HaHar, he was accompanied by his brother Moses, as well as his (Aaron's) elder son Eleazar and younger son Ithamar.  Upon entry to the cave where Aaron died, he witnessed as his brother Moses dressed his elder son Eleazer with the clothes of the high priesthood, as initiation to high priesthood. Jewish commentaries on the Bible express that this initiation ceremony served as the catalyst for the stipulation that all future candidates of high priesthood be patrilineal descendants of Eleazar the elder son of Aaron and not Ithamar - the younger son. Similarly, the Hebrew Bible relates how, at the time Phineas son of Eleazar appeased God's anger, he merited the divine blessing of God;   Torah commentators such as Yosef Karo and explain that the continuity of high priesthood is put forth to the descendants of Phineas from this noted verse.

The removal of the priesthood from the house of Ithamar to the house of Zadok

Torah commentators record that Phineas sinned due to his not availing his servitude of Torah instruction to the masses at the time leading up to the Battle of Gibeah.  In addition, he also failed to address the needs of relieving Jephthah of his vow.  As consequence, the high priesthood was taken from him and given to the offspring of Ithamar, essentially Eli and his sons. Upon the sin of Eli's sons, Hophni and Phinehas, Elkanah prophesied the return of high priesthood to the sons of Eleazar;  This prophecy of Elkanah ultimately happened in the era of King David when Zadok from the progeny of Eleazar was appointed as high priest. The Metzudoth and Obadiah ben Jacob Sforno comment that the service of Zadok and his sons was in line with the will of God even at times when the actions of the general nation was not. The Midrash Rabba relates how Zadok and offspring were righteous in their personal actions and service to the Temple to the point that were Aaron and his sons present at the era of Zadok and sons, Zadok and sons would supersede them in quality (Koheleth Rabbah Chap. 1). Rashi comments that since Zadok functioned first as high priest in Solomon's Temple, as opposed to the tabernacle, which was mobile, and also busied himself with establishing the twenty-four priestly divisions, he merited that the preferred lineage of Eleazar be called by his name, "the sons of Zadok (as opposed to being titled the sons of Eleazar), and the entire concept of the twenty-four divisions be attributed to him (Rashi to Ezekiel 43:19).

The sons of Zadok in the Book of Ezekiel 

The three Hebrew Bible mentions of the sons of Zadok in the Third Temple occur in the book of Ezekiel.  These sources are presented in spite of Ezekiel himself, as a kohen (Jewish priest), being from the descendants of Ithamar and not Eleazar, as are Zadok and sons.

Dead Sea scrolls 
Various documents of the texts found at Qumran mention the teachers of the community as "kohanim Sons of Zadok", leading some scholars to assume that the community at Qumran included kohanim (Jewish priests) who refused to participate in the Hellenization of the priesthood then taking place in Jerusalem.

The possible "Zadokite" origin of the Sadducees 

Abraham Geiger (1857), the founder of Reform Judaism, was of the opinion that the Sadducee (Tzadoki in Mishnaic pronunciation) sect of Judaism drew their name from Zadok the high priest in The First Temple, and that the leaders of the Sadducees were in fact the "Sons of Zadok".

However Avot of Rabbi Natan (5:2) states that the Sadducees began at the same time as the Boethusians, and their founder was a later Zadok who, like Boethus, was a student of Antigonus of Sokho during the second century BCE, who preceded the Zugot era during the Second Temple period.

Sifri, the Tannaitic midrash on Deuteronomy, took a dim view of both the Sadducees and Boethusian groups not only due their perceived carefree approach to keeping to written Torah and Oral Torah law, but also due their attempts to persuade common-folk to join their ranks.

Maimonides viewed the Sadducees as Gonvei Da'at (stealers of the mind/knowledge) of the greater Jewish nation and of intentionally negating the Chazalic interpretation of Torah (Torah Shebal Peh).  Likewise, in his Mishneh Torah treatise he defines the Sadducees as "Harming Israel and causing the nation to stray from following HaShem.

Considering the lack of Chazalic documentary indicating a connection between Zadok the first high priest and the later Zadok student of Antignos of Sokho, along with the thirteen or more generations between the two Zadoks, Rabbinical writings tend to put a damper on that association Additional aspects disproving that association include a Chazalic mention that the Sadducee and Boethusian groups favored using vessels of Gold and Silver whereas the common vessel usage of Kohanim - to negate transmission of uncleanliness - were typically of stone.

Rabbinical commentary
Ezekiel records the general rebellion of the children of Israel against God (Meir Leibush ben Yehiel Michal to Ezekiel chap. 2). Rabbinic commentators understood this general rebellion as referring to that of Jeroboam and the Ten Tribes against the Kingdom of David and the priesthood of Zadok. A number of commentators point out that at the time of a popular rebellion the true adherents to the king stand firm in their commitment of support to the king, and once the rebellions subsides the king comes forth the reward his unwavering supporters. As recognition for not participating in idol worship and for actively and publicly sanctifying God's holy name, the sons of Zadok were granted numerous benefits in the Third Temple(Meir Leibush ben Yehiel Michal to Malachi 3:3). Asher ben Jehiel in his Torah commentary likens the public actions of the sons of Zadok to those of the Tribe of Levi at the time of the sin of the Golden Calf (Rosh to Deuteronomy 10:8). In describing the uniqueness of the sons of Zadok, Rabbinic commentators liken their ability to reject Idol worship to that of a person with Medical Immunity against a plague, thus allowing them to function normally while others succumb to its undesirable results.

This specific Kohanic family proved themselves as loyal to the service of Yahweh in terms of not submitting to the then popular theme of idol worship - as did the general population of Jerusalem as well as the Kohanim (plural form of Kohen). According to Meir Leibush ben Yehiel Michal on Ezekiel 4:5 the period of idol worship initiated from the rebellion of Jeroboam up until the destruction of the First Temple.

The book of Ezekiel details that the family line of priests, sons of Zadok, will execute the primary services in the Third Temple, that is the services of the altar of the burnt-offering.  According to Oral Torah, the choosing and appointing of the high priest depends on the appointee being a descendant of Zadok, in the Midrash ha-Gadol to Genesiu 6:4 et al.  As well, the Jewish establishment of the Second Temple upon return from Babylonian captivity included this specific prerequisite of the high priest being of Zadokite descent, according to Rashi.

The Jewish liturgist Shmuel HaNagid wove the timely actions of the sons of Zadok into his composition;

Meir Leibush ben Yehiel Michal comments that unlike the sons of Zadok who did not submit to idol worship the other priests who served idols are not eligible to service the altar of burnt offering but only other services, such as song service.  In regards to terumah and kodesh (sacrificial) consumption, those priests will be eligible in the future Third Temple.

As high priests 

Rabbinic commentators on the haftarah of the Sabbath Torah reading of Emor, the 8th Section of Leviticus, that discusses the sons of Zadok, Ahavath Yonathan, Jonathan Eybeschutz, Isaac Abrabanel, Meir Leibush ben Yehiel Michal, note that the status of the sons of Zadok after the coming of the Messiah will be that of "semi" high priests.

One similarity shared by the High Priest and the Sons of Zadok is the instance that the Law prohibiting the High Priest from defiling himself by contact with a dead family member lists the father before listing the mother.  This same sequence is followed regarding the sons of Zadok as opposed the standard priest, where the mother is listed first, the former listed in Parshat Emor in Leviticus and the latter in the Haftarah to Parshat Emor.

Categorization of the sons of Zadok as quasi-High-Priests is not purported to discount the notion of one of the sons of Zadok being singled out for role as full high priest.  Such, there is Rabbinic documentary that describe the future high priest from the sons of Zadok as having certain priorities, or at least being equal to the future Jewish Messiah King. (Torah study to Samuel 1 2:37)

Initial sacrifice offering 
From the detail listed in Ezekiel regarding the future inauguration by the sons of Zadok of the altar of burnt offering in the Third Temple, the type of animal listed is a bull (Ezekiel 43:19), the animal typically reserved as a sacrifice of the high priest.

Primary obligations 
The sons of Zadok are noted by Ezekiel as acting on the primary services in the Third Temple, mainly the handling and sacrificing of fat and blood of sacrifices and organizing the showbread:

Kabbalic analysis 
Jonathan Eybeschutz explains the prophetic choosing of the words "fat and blood" to describe the sons of Zadok's actions as symbolizing the union of spirituality and physicality, as opposed to using the word mincha (offering) which usually connotes a vegetable offering. Additionally, the choice of the words "they will come close to my table to serve me", noting that the table is placed to the North side of the Temple, symbolizes monetary control (as per common Kaballah teaching that north is synonymous with monetary issue) without concern of the sons of Zadok falling to temptation of Bribery and similar monetary injustices (Ahavath Yonathan to Haftarah Emor reading in Leviticus).

Garments of linen 

The sons of Zadok are instructed to don priestly clothing exclusively made of linen when performing Temple service, and to refrain entirely from using wool, commonly used in the standard priestly sash.

Commentators write that wearing exclusively linen clothing is considered haughty and showy, therefore the sons of Zadok are permitted to wear clothes of wool when going out to mingle with the nation. An additional explanation to refraining from wool during service in the inner court is the nature of sheep to graze in any field they find – even one that the owner does not specifically give permission to (i.e. theft), whereas linen – as a crop – grows where the sustenance-source of the crop is taken by and with the will of the field owner.

Kabbalic rational 
Some Mekubalim (teachers of Kabbala) reason that the spiritual source of the Sons of Zadok is that of the sitra of Cain (In the Kabbalah Cain's soul belongs to the Sitra Ahara, the demonic side), where Cain's spiritual source will be elevated to goodness in the messianic era, and therefore are instructed to don linen for the temple service, as it was the fruit of the linen crop that Cain chose to sacrifice to God.

Marriage prohibitions 

Ezekiel 44 prohibits "priests, Levites, sons of Zadok" from certain marriages:

The stipulation that a priest is forbidden from marrying a divorcee is already known from Leviticus 21:1–24:23. However, the inclusion of forbidding a widow, which was usually permitted to a priest if not the high priest, is a subject of Rabbinic debate. The Talmud Bavli reads that the earlier part of Ezekiel 44 relates to the sons of Zadok, whereas 44:22 relates to priests who are not of Zadokite descent, meaning that the Zadokites, like the high priest, were forbidden from marrying a widow (B.Kiddushin 78b). This explanation is echoed by the Malbim, Jonathan Eibshitz, and other commentators who see the future status of the sons of Zadok in a Third Temple as quasi-high priests.

Reasoning 
Jonathan Eybeschutz explains that the widow of a priest is instructed by Ezekiel to marry another priest so as not be demoted from eating terumah, but she is nonetheless forbidden from marrying the sons of Zadok.  Along with his view, others explain that since the sons of Zadok are ordered by Ezekiel to be active in the Torah instruction of the Kohanim, the need to have a positive public image is crucial and marrying a widow may cause gossip and rumor that the Zadokite priest had transgressed forbidden relationships in Judaism. Similarly, there is the concern that the widow of a non-priest was initially a divorcee, and over time this fact was forgotten, whereas the widow of a priest is likely not a divorcee since all priests are forbidden from marrying divorcees.  Jonathan Eybeschutz also reasons is the marital life quality with a widow is not one of full tranquility.  As well, the wording of Ezekiel directs the Zadokite priest to marry a virgin, as he is to maintain a disposition of peace. Meir Leibush ben Yehiel Michal favors the initial marriage of the sons of Zadok with the daughter of a priest.

Alternative interpretation 
Others understand the ending part of the verse to concern the Sons of Zadok as well (i.e. a Son of Zadok is permitted to marry the widow of another priest).  The Chasam Sofer reasons that only the widow of the priest is permitted to the Sons of Zadok since the purity (marital integrity) level of the former wife of a priest is of greater quality than that of the standard daughter of Israel.  Along this style of reasoning, others explain that the turmoil of the Jewish diaspora is cause for loss of marital integrity amongst the greater Jewish population whereas the Kohanim are more apt at maintaining an above-average standard of integrity for their spouses -thus the widow of a priest is permitted to the sons of Zadok.

Torah instruction and sanctifying Shabbat 
The sons of Zadok are directed to devote themselves to a national theme of Torah instruction;

Judicial obligations 

The appointment of the sons of Zadok to teach the law appears to be redundant to the standard portrayal of the priest as instructor;

Other Hebrew Bible verses direct the priest to be judges at Torah law, to be involved with curing skin disease, the law of the anonymous murder victim (see Shoftim (parsha)), and Sotah justice.  Although these items are expounded on by Chazal, there is not an absolute Chazalic directive that requires the Kohanim to busy themselves with monetary justice.

Chaim Yosef David Azulai, based on the writings of Samson ben Pesah Ostropoli, explains that the sons of Zadok are required to commit to judging monetary disputes, and are divinely blessed with an inherent ability to conquer the negative attribute of forgetfulness and to judge truthfully.

Guarding the Sabbath
Commentators explain that the Zadokite priests are told to guard the Sabbath since they are permitted to do certain activities prohibited on Shabbat due to sacrificial activity that override Shabbat in the Temple, there is concern that they may come to do so outside the Temple (Meir Leibush ben Yehiel Michal on Ezekiel 44:24).  An additional concern is due to their requirement to engage in judicial activity they may transgress Shabbat by writing down item that pertain to law and order.  Likewise, there is the need to ascertain the sons of Zadok will not issue a death sentence on the Shabbat.

The Mekubalim, Kabbalah mystics, note that in the Messianic era the concept of nightfall and darkness will cease, thus no visual indication of the start of Shabbat will be present (as Shabbat typically begins at sunset), thus the sons of Zadok will be responsible for indicating to the nation of Israel the precise start time of sanctifying Shabbat. Zadok HaKohen of Lublin writes that the observance of Shabbat by the priests, who are otherwise sustained by the twenty-four kohanic gifts and do not participate in the national workforce, causes a surplus of kedusha to the entire nation of Israel and protects them from submitting to evil impulses.

Apportioned chambers 

Due to the sons of Zadok performing the altar of burnt offering services of the Third Temple, a specified chamber is apportioned to them as per the architectural detail laid out by Ezekiel.  The verse describes one unique aspect of this chamber (compared to the other chambers) in the aspect that its entry-point faces North (as opposed to the other chambers opening towards South). Torah commentators describe that since the Zadokite priests are given the duties of the altar of burnt offering, therefore their chamber is situated at the South of the ramp leading up to the Mizbeach, with the entry and exit to their chamber facing North, thereby allowing them easy and direct access to this ramp (Meir Leibush ben Yehiel Michal on Ezekiel 40:41).  The text in Ezekiel does not however, detail the size of this chamber nor describe if it is apportioned to multiple rooms in itself or if it is one large room.

Estates in Jerusalem 
As per the prophetic vision of Ezekiel regarding the divisions of the Land of Israel to the Twelve tribes of Israel and to the Messiah, the apportioning of a swath of land to the Sons of Zadok around the Temple Mount is mentioned.  The measurement of this area is specified as 4,750 kanns (The kann measurement of Ezekiel is described as six amahs, with each amah consisting of six tefachs) beginning from the southern end of the Temple Mount heading South and from the opposite edge of the Temple Mount leading North, 12,250 kanns leading West and likewise to the East.  This portion of the sons of Zadok is included in the 25,000 by 25,000 kanns that are to be given the greater Tribe of Levi with the greater tribe of Levi including Kohanim as well (Ezezkiel chapters 45 and 48).

Identifying Kohens of Zadokite lineage 
Rav Hai Gaon, in a letter-document sent to the Priests of Djerba (see also Beit Knesset Kohanim HaDintreisa), describes multiple personality aspects to be used in identifying genuine Kohanim. Hai Gaon, in his letter, describes the character traits of the Kohanim sons of Zadok as such:

Known priests of Zadokite lineage 
Priests in the Hebrew Bible of Zadokite lineage include Ezra and his relative Joshua the High Priest.

Commonly known Rabbinic kohanim of Zadokite lineage include the Tanna Eleazar ben Azariah, noted as being of tenth generation lineage to Ezra.  The Babylonian Talmud introduces "Rabbi Ezrah the great-grandson of Rabbi Avtulas" as a Kohen of tenth generation from Rabbi Elazar Ben Azariah.

Rabbi Rifael Ziskind Katz of Hamburg was likewise known to be a descendant of the biblical Ezra, his patrilineal grandsons include HaRav HaNazir, and modern Rabbinic persona She'ar Yashuv Cohen and Yoel Kahan.

Rabbinic literature indicates that there were numerous priestly families of Zadokite lineage – amongst them David HaKohain Bar Isha, who upon the Spanish expulsion in 1492, emigrated to the town of Debdou in Morocco – a town purported to have consisted of a large population of Jewish priests.

The Sons of Zadok in Christianity
The idea of a literal fulfillment of Ezekiel's Third Temple in Jerusalem is an idea shared between some schools of Judaism and some millennial or adventist Protestants. These beliefs may include the reinstatement of animal sacrifices, and the reestablishment of a Zadokite priesthood: 

This verse also compares Revelation 1:4–5, 5:9–10 stating that all who are saved by His blood, also are made priest unto God the Father. It speaks of a present priesthood existing as well as into the future for all Christians.

See also 

 Essenes
 Related Bible parts: Ezekiel 43, Ezekiel 44
 The Mitzvah of sanctifying the Kohen

External links 
 DNA family project for kohanim sons of Zadok at Family Tree DNA

References 

Priesthood (Judaism)
9th-century BC clergy
Dead Sea Scrolls
Essene texts
Book of Ezekiel
Jewish families